The 2015–16 Irish Cup (known as the Tennent's Irish Cup for sponsorship purposes) was the 136th edition of the premier knock-out cup competition in Northern Irish football since its introduction in 1881. The competition began on 18 August 2015 with the first round and concluded with the final at Windsor Park on 7 May 2016. The cup was sponsored by Tennent's Lager, the competition's first title sponsor since 2012.

Glentoran were the defending champions, after they lifted the cup for the second time in three seasons and for the 22nd time overall by defeating Portadown 1–0 in the 2015 final. Their defence of the Cup ended in the sixth round after falling to a 4–1 home defeat against 2013–14 winners, Glenavon.

Glenavon who were the eventual winners after beating Linfield 2-0 in the final, qualified for the 2016–17 UEFA Europa League first qualifying round

Format and Schedule
129 clubs entered this season's competition, an increase of four clubs compared with the 2014–15 total of 125 clubs. 82 regional league clubs from tiers 4–7 in the Northern Ireland football league system entered the competition in the first round, with a further seven clubs receiving byes to proceed directly into the second round as necessitated by the number of participants. These clubs contested the first three rounds, with the 12 surviving clubs joining the 28 NIFL Championship clubs in the fourth round. The 12 NIFL Premiership clubs enter the competition in the fifth round, along with the 20 winners from the fourth round matches. All ties level after 90 minutes used extra time to determine the winner, with a penalty shoot-out to follow if necessary.

Results
Note: The league tier of each club at the time of entering the competition is listed in parentheses.

First round
The draw for the first round was made on 22 July 2015 with the matches played between 18 and 22 August 2015.

Seven clubs received byes into the second round, namely: Downpatrick (4), Dunmurry Recreation (5), Groomsport (7), Larne Tech Old Boys (5), Oxford United Stars (4), Rathfriland Rangers (5) and Seagoe (5).

Note: All entrants at this stage were at regional level (tiers 4–7).

|-
|colspan="3" style="background:#E8FFD8;"|18 August 2015

|-
|colspan="3" style="background:#E8FFD8;"|20 August 2015

|-
|colspan="3" style="background:#E8FFD8;"|21 August 2015

|-
|colspan="3" style="background:#E8FFD8;"|22 August 2015

|}
Source: irishfa.com

Second round
48 clubs competed in the second round; the 41 winners from the first round matches, along with the seven clubs that received byes. The draw took place on 25 August 2015, with the matches played on 3 October 2015.

Note: All entrants at this stage were at regional level (tiers 4–7).

|}
Source: irishfa.com

Third round
The 24 winners from the second round entered this round. The draw took place on 13 October 2015, with the fixtures played on 7 November 2015. As the only tier 7 club remaining, Downshire Young Men were the lowest-ranked side to reach this stage of the competition, but were ultimately knocked out after a narrow 3–2 defeat to Crumlin United.

Note: All entrants at this stage were at regional level (tiers 4–7).

|}
Source: irishfa.com

Fourth round
The fourth round draw was completed on 10 November 2015, with the matches completed between 5 December 2015 and 2 January 2016. The 28 NIFL Championship clubs entered the competition at this stage, and were joined by the 12 third round winners. As the only tier 6 club remaining, Wellington Recreation were the lowest-ranked side to reach this stage of the competition, but they were eliminated by Harland & Wolff Welders.

Note: Intermediate clubs entered the competition at this stage (tiers 2–3).

|-
|colspan="3" style="background:#E8FFD8;"|5 December 2015

|-
|colspan="3" style="background:#E8FFD8;"|8 December 2015

|-
|colspan="3" style="background:#E8FFD8;"|9 December 2015

|-
|colspan="3" style="background:#E8FFD8;"|19 December 2015

|-
|colspan="3" style="background:#E8FFD8;"|2 January 2016

|}

Fifth round
The fifth round draw took place on 8 December 2015, with the matches completed on 9 and 19 January 2016. The 20 winners from the fourth round matches joined the 12 NIFL Premiership clubs to make up the final 32 clubs. As the sole remaining club from tier 5, Rathfriland Rangers were the lowest ranked side to reach the fifth round, but were eliminated by Crusaders.

Note: Senior clubs entered the competition at this stage (tier 1).

Sixth Round
The sixth round draw was made on 9 January 2016, with the matches played on 6 and 15 February 2016. The 16 winners from the fifth round matches entered this round. As the only representative from outside the Northern Ireland Football League, Crumlin Star were the lowest-ranked club to reach this stage of the competition, but they were eliminated after a narrow 1–0 defeat against Carrick Rangers.

Quarter-finals
The 8 winners of the sixth round matches entered the quarter-finals. The draw took place on 6 February 2016, with the matches played on 5 March 2016. As the only two representatives from outside the NIFL Premiership, second tier sides Loughgall and Lurgan Celtic were the lowest-ranked clubs to reach the quarter-finals. It was Lurgan Celtic's first ever appearance in the quarter-finals. Most notably, this round of matches saw Ronnie McFall's reign as Portadown manager come to an end after 29 years. Appointed in December 1986, he was at the time the longest-serving manager in European football, and resigned after his side's shock 3–2 home defeat against Lurgan Celtic.

Semi-finals
The 4 quarter-final winners entered the semi-finals, with the matches played at Windsor Park on 1 and 2 April 2016. The dates for the matches were switched after the draw, following a request from the PSNI. As the only representative from outside the NIFL Premiership remaining, second tier side Lurgan Celtic were the lowest-ranked club to reach the semi-finals. It was their first ever appearance in the semi-finals, but they were eliminated by Linfield.

Final
The final was played on 7 May 2016 at Windsor Park. Linfield appeared in the final for a record 62nd time, the seventh time in eleven seasons, and the first time since winning a third consecutive cup in the 2012 final. Glenavon reached the final for the second time in three seasons after winning the cup in 2013–14. It was only the fourth ever meeting between the two sides in the final, and the first since the 1992 final when Glenavon defeated Linfield 2–1 at the Oval to win the cup for the fourth time. History would repeat itself as Glenavon went on to beat Linfield 2-0 to win the cup for the seventh time and the second time in three seasons

References

External links
 Official site
 nifootball.co.uk

2015-16
Cup
2015–16 European domestic association football cups